This is a list of the Catholic dioceses in Europe, i.e. dioceses of the Catholic Church. Italy has the largest number of dioceses per capita of any country, although Brazil has more in total.

An episcopal conference, or bishops' conference, is an official assembly of all the bishops in a defined geographic territory, usually a single country. Andorra and San Marino are part of neighboring foreign dioceses, and so are covered by the Spanish and Italian conferences, respectively. A single conference covers the five nordic countries, and dioceses in Gibraltar, Liechtenstein, Luxembourg, and Monaco are not part of any episcopal conference. In the British Isles, one conference covers the whole of Ireland, a second covers England and Wales (and the crown dependencies), and a third conference covers Scotland.

Dioceses are usually organized into ecclesiastical provinces headed by the archbishop seated in the designated metropolitan archdiocese. Bishops and dioceses subordinated to the metropolitan archbishop are called suffragans. However, not all archbishops are metropolitans. Sometimes an archdiocesan see is suffragan to a metropolitan archbishop, but retains its rank for historical reasons. Some dioceses and archdioceses are not suffragan to a metropolitan see, but are directly subject to the Holy See in Rome.

List of Dioceses  
This list is organized (when applicable) by episcopal conference and ecclesiastical province. Latin Church dioceses are listed in regular font. Eastern Catholic dioceses are listed in italics, only when suffragan to a Latin jurisdiction. Dioceses of sui iuris Eastern Catholic Churches are not listed.

 Ecclesiastical province
Metropolitan archdiocese
Suffragan dioceses (Latin Church)
Suffragan dioceses (Eastern Catholic)

Episcopal Conference of Albania
 Ecclesiastical Province of Shkodër-Pult
Archdiocese of Shkodër-Pult 
Diocese of Lezhë 
Diocese of Sapë

 Ecclesiastical Province of Tiranë-Durrës
Archdiocese of Tiranë-Durrës 
Diocese of Rrëshen 
Apostolic Administration of Southern Albania

Episcopal Conference of Austria
 Ecclesiastical Province of Salzburg
Archdiocese of Salzburg 
Diocese of Feldkirch 
Diocese of Graz-Seckau
Diocese of Gurk
Diocese of Innsbruck

 Ecclesiastical Province of Wien
Archdiocese of Wien 
Diocese of Eisenstadt 
Diocese of Linz
Diocese of Sankt Pölten

 Immediately subject to the Holy See
Military Ordinariate of Austria
Territorial Abbey of Wettingen-Mehrerau

Episcopal Conference of Belarus
 Ecclesiastical Province of Minsk-Mohilev
Archdiocese of Minsk-Mohilev 
Diocese of Hrodna 
Diocese of Pinsk
Diocese of Vitebsk

Episcopal Conference of Belgium
 Ecclesiastical Province of Mechelen-Brussels
Archdiocese of Mechelen-Brussels 
Diocese of Antwerp 
Diocese of Bruges
Diocese of Ghent
Diocese of Hasselt
Diocese of Liège
Diocese of Namur
Diocese of Tournai

Episcopal Conference of Bosnia
 Ecclesiastical Province of Sarajevo
Archdiocese of Vrhbosna 
Diocese of Banja Luka 
Diocese of Mostar Duvno
Diocese of Skopje

Episcopal Conference of Bulgaria
 Immediately subject to the Holy See
Diocese of Nicopoli
Diocese of Sofia and Plovdiv
Apostolic Exarchate of Sophia

Episcopal Conference of Croatia
 Ecclesiastical Province of Rijeka
Archdiocese of Rijeka 
Diocese of Gospić–Senj 
Diocese of Krk
Diocese of Poreč i Pula

 Ecclesiastical Province of Sirmio
Archdiocese of Đakovo-Osijek 
Diocese of Požega
Diocese of Srijem (in Serbia)

 Ecclesiastical Province of Split-Makarska
Archdiocese of Split-Makarska 
Diocese of Dubrovnik 
Diocese of Hvar
Diocese of Kotor (in Montenegro)
Diocese of Šibenik

 Ecclesiastical Province of Zagreb
Archdiocese of Zagreb 
Eparchy of Križevci
Diocese of Varaždin

Episcopal Conference of the Czech Republic
 Ecclesiastical province of Bohemia
 Archdiocese of Prague
 Diocese of České Budějovice
 Diocese of Hradec Králové
 Diocese of Litoměřice
 Diocese of Plzeň

 Ecclesiastical province of Moravia (Archbishopric of Moravia)
 Archdiocese of Olomouc
 Diocese of Brno
 Diocese of Ostrava-Opava

Episcopal Conference of England and Wales
 Ecclesiastical province of Birmingham 
 Archdiocese of Birmingham
 Diocese of Clifton
 Diocese of Shrewsbury

 Ecclesiastical province of Cardiff 
 Archdiocese of Cardiff
 Diocese of Menevia
 Diocese of Wrexham

 Ecclesiastical province of Liverpool 
 Archdiocese of Liverpool
 Diocese of Hallam
 Diocese of Hexham and Newcastle
 Diocese of Lancaster
 Diocese of Leeds
 Diocese of Middlesbrough
 Diocese of Salford

 Ecclesiastical province of Southwark 
 Archdiocese of Southwark
 Diocese of Arundel and Brighton
 Diocese of Plymouth
 Diocese of Portsmouth

 Ecclesiastical province of Westminster 
 Archdiocese of Westminster
 Diocese of Brentwood
 Diocese of East Anglia
 Diocese of Northampton
 Diocese of Nottingham

Episcopal Conference of France

 Ecclesiastical Province of Besançon
Metropolitan Archdiocese of Besançon 
Diocese of Belfort-Montbéliard
Diocese of Nancy
Diocese of Saint-Claude 
Diocese of Saint-Dié 
Diocese of Verdun

 Ecclesiastical Province of Bordeaux
Metropolitan Archdiocese of Bordeaux
Diocese of Agen 
Diocese of Aire 
Diocese of Bayonne
Diocese of Périgueux

 Ecclesiastical Province of Clermont
Metropolitan Archdiocese of Clermont 
Diocese of Le Puy-en-Velay
Diocese of Moulins
Diocese of Saint-Flour

 Ecclesiastical Province of Dijon
Metropolitan Archdiocese of Dijon 
Archdiocese of Sens 
Diocese of Autun
Diocese of Nevers 
Territorial prelature of the Mission de France at Pontigny

 Ecclesiastical Province of Lille
 Metropolitan Archdiocese of Lille
Archdiocese of Cambrai
Diocese of Arras

 Ecclesiastical Province of Lyon
 Metropolitan Archdiocese of Lyon 
Archdiocese of Chambéry
Diocese of Annecy 
Diocese of Belley-Ars
Diocese of Grenoble-Vienne 
Diocese of Saint-Étienne
Diocese of Valence = Drôme
Diocese of Viviers = Ardèche

 Ecclesiastical Province of Marseille
Metropolitan Archdiocese of Marseille
Archdiocese of Aix
Archdiocese of Avignon 
Diocese of Ajaccio 
Diocese of Digne
Diocese of Fréjus-Toulon 
Diocese of Gap
Diocese of Nice

 Ecclesiastical Province of Montpellier
Metropolitan Archdiocese of Montpellier 
Diocese of Carcassonne
Diocese of Mende
Diocese of Nîmes 
Diocese of Perpignan-Elne

 Ecclesiastical Province of Paris
 Metropolitan Archdiocese of Paris
Diocese of Créteil 
Diocese of Évry–Corbeil-Essonnes 
Diocese of Meaux 
Diocese of Nanterre
Diocese of Pontoise
Diocese of Saint-Denis 
Diocese of Versailles

 Ecclesiastical Province of Poitiers
Metropolitan Archdiocese of Poitiers
Diocese of Angoulême 
Diocese of La Rochelle 
Diocese of Limoges 
Diocese of Tulle

 Ecclesiastical Province of Reims
Archdiocese of Reims 
Diocese of Amiens 
Diocese of Beauvais 
Diocese of Châlons 
Diocese of Langres 
Diocese of Soissons 
Diocese of Troyes

 Ecclesiastical Province of Rennes
Metropolitan Archdiocese of Rennes 
Diocese of Angers
Diocese of Laval
Diocese of Le Mans 
Diocese of Luçon 
Diocese of Nantes
Diocese of Quimper 
Diocese of Saint-Brieuc 
Diocese of Vannes

 Ecclesiastical Province of Rouen
Metropolitan Archdiocese of Rouen 
Diocese of Bayeux 
Diocese of Coutances 
Diocese of Évreux 
Diocese of Le Havre 
Diocese of Sées

 Ecclesiastical Province of Toulouse
Metropolitan Archdiocese of Toulouse 
Archdiocese of Albi 
Archdiocese of Auch
Diocese of Cahors 
Diocese of Montauban 
Diocese of Pamiers 
Diocese of Rodez 
Diocese of Tarbes-et-Lourdes

 Ecclesiastical Province of Tours
Metropolitan Archdiocese of Tours 
Archdiocese of Bourges 
Diocese of Blois 
Diocese of Chartres 
Diocese of Orléans

Immediately subject to the Holy See
Diocese of Metz
Archdiocese of Strasbourg

Episcopal Conference of Germany
 Ecclesiastical province of Bamburg 
 Archdiocese of Bamberg
 Diocese of Eichstätt
 Diocese of Speyer
 Diocese of Würzburg

 Ecclesiastical province of Berlin 
 Archdiocese of Berlin
 Diocese of Dresden-Meissen
 Diocese of Görlitz

 Ecclesiastical province of Hamburg 
 Archdiocese of Hamburg
 Diocese of Hildesheim
 Diocese of Osnabrück

 Middle German ecclesiastical province
(aka Ecclesiastical province of Paderborn)
 Archdiocese of Paderborn
 Diocese of Erfurt
 Diocese of Fulda
 Diocese of Magdeburg

 Ecclesiastical province of Munich and Freising 
 Archdiocese of Munich and Freising
 Diocese of Augsburg
 Diocese of Passau
 Diocese of Regensburg

 Rhenish ecclesiastical province
(aka Ecclesiastical province of Cologne)
 Archdiocese of Cologne
 Diocese of Aachen
 Diocese of Essen
 Diocese of Limburg
 Diocese of Münster
 Diocese of Trier

 Upper Rhenish ecclesiastical province
(aka Ecclesiastical province of Freiburg im Breisgau)
 Archdiocese of Freiburg
 Diocese of Mainz
 Diocese of Rottenburg-Stuttgart

Episcopal Conference of Greece
 Ecclesiastical Province of Corfù, Zante e Cefalonia
Archdiocese of Corfù, Zante e Cefalonia

 Ecclesiastical Province of Naxos, Andros, Tinos e Mykonos
Archdiocese of Naxos, Andros, Tinos and Mykonos 
Diocese of Chios 
Diocese of Crete
Diocese of Santorini
Diocese of Syros e Milos

Episcopal Conference of Hungary
 Ecclesiastical Province of Eger
Archdiocese of Eger 
Diocese of Debrecen–Nyíregyháza 
Diocese of Vác

 Ecclesiastical Province of Esztergom-Budapest
Archdiocese of Esztergom-Budapest 
Diocese of Győr 
Diocese of Hajdúdorog
Diocese of Székesfehérvár

 Ecclesiastical Province of Kalocsa-Kecskemét
Archdiocese of Kalocsa-Kecskemét 
Diocese of Pécs 
Diocese of Szeged–Csanád

 Ecclesiastical Province of Veszprém
Archdiocese of Veszprém 
Diocese of Kaposvár 
Diocese of Szombathely

Episcopal Conference of Ireland 
 Ecclesiastical province of Armagh 
Archdiocese of Armagh
Diocese of Ardagh and Clonmacnoise 
Diocese of Clogher
Diocese of Derry 
Diocese of Down and Connor
Diocese of Dromore 
Diocese of Kilmore
Diocese of Meath
Diocese of Raphoe

 Ecclesiastical province of Cashel 
Archdiocese of Cashel 
Diocese of Cloyne
Diocese of Cork and Ross
Diocese of Kerry
Diocese of Killaloe
Diocese of Limerick
Diocese of Waterford and Lismore

 Ecclesiastical province of Dublin 
Archdiocese of Dublin
Diocese of Ferns
Diocese of Kildare and Leighlin
Diocese of Ossory

 Ecclesiastical province of Tuam 
Archdiocese of Tuam
Diocese of Achonry
Diocese of Clonfert
Diocese of Elphin
Diocese of Galway and Kilmacduagh and Kilfenora
Diocese of Killala

Episcopal Conference of Italy
 Ecclesiastical Province of Agrigento
Archdiocese of Agrigento
Diocese of Caltanissetta
Diocese of Piazza Armerina

 Ecclesiastical Province of Ancona-Osimo
Archdiocese of Ancona-Osimo
Diocese of Fabriano-Matelica
Diocese of Jesi
Diocese of Senigallia
Territorial Prelature of Loreto

 Ecclesiastical Province of Bari-Bitonto
Archdiocese of Bari-Bitonto
Archdiocese of Trani-Barletta-Bisceglie
Diocese of Altamura-Gravina-Acquaviva delle Fonti
Diocese of Andria
Diocese of Conversano-Monopoli
Diocese of Molfetta-Ruvo-Giovinazzo-Terlizzi

 Ecclesiastical Province of Benevento
Archdiocese of Benevento
Archdiocese of Sant'Angelo dei Lombardi-Conza-Nusco-Bisaccia
Diocese of Ariano Irpino-Lacedonia
Diocese of Avellino
Diocese of Cerreto Sannita-Telese-Sant’Agata de’ Goti
Territorial Abbey of Montevergine

 Ecclesiastical Province of Bologna
Archdiocese of Bologna
Archdiocese of Ferrara-Comacchio
Diocese of Faenza-Modigliana
Diocese of Imola

 Ecclesiastical Province of Campobasso-Boiano
Archdiocese of Campobasso-Boiano
Diocese of Isernia-Venafro
Diocese of Termoli-Larino
Diocese of Trivento

 Ecclesiastical Province of Cagliari
Archdiocese of Cagliari
Diocese of Iglesias
Diocese of Lanusei
Diocese of Nuoro

 Ecclesiastical Province of Catanzaro-Squillace
Archdiocese of Catanzaro-Squillace
Archdiocese of Crotone-Santa Severina
Diocese of Lamezia Terme

 Ecclesiastical Province of Catania
Archdiocese of Catania
Diocese of Acireale
Diocese of Caltagirone

 Ecclesiastical Province of Chieti-Vasto
Archdiocese of Chieti-Vasto
Archdiocese of Lanciano-Ortona

 Ecclesiastical Province of Cosenza-Bisignano
Archdiocese of Cosenza-Bisignano
Archdiocese of Rossano-Cariati
Diocese of Cassano all'Jonio
Diocese of San Marco Argentano-Scalea

 Ecclesiastical Province of Fermo
Archdiocese of Fermo
Archdiocese of Camerino-San Severino Marche
Diocese of Ascoli Piceno
Diocese of Macerata-Tolentino-Recanati-Cingoli-Treia
Diocese of San Benedetto del Tronto-Ripatransone-Montalto

 Ecclesiastical Province of Florence

Archdiocese of Florence
Diocese of Arezzo-Cortona-Sansepolcro
Diocese of Fiesole
Diocese of Pistoia
Diocese of Prato
Diocese of San Miniato

 Ecclesiastical Province of Foggia-Bovino
Archdiocese of Foggia-Bovino
Archdiocese of Manfredonia-Vieste-S. Giovanni Rotondo
Diocese of Cerignola-Ascoli Satriano
Diocese of Lucera-Troia
Diocese of San Severo

 Ecclesiastical Province of Genoa
Archdiocese of Genoa
Diocese of Albenga-Imperia
Diocese of Chiavari
Diocese of La Spezia-Sarzana-Brugnato
Diocese of Savona-Noli
Diocese of Tortona
Diocese of Ventimiglia-San Remo

 Ecclesiastical Province of Gorizia
Archdiocese of Gorizia
Diocese of Trieste

 Ecclesiastical Province of L'Aquila
Archdiocese of L'Aquila
Diocese of Avezzano
Diocese of Sulmona-Valva

 Ecclesiastical Province of Lecce
Archdiocese of Lecce
Archdiocese of Brindisi-Ostuni
Archdiocese of Otranto
Diocese of Nardò-Gallipoli
Diocese of Ugento-Santa Maria di Leuca

 Ecclesiastical Province of Messina-Lipari-Santa Lucia del Mela
Archdiocese of Messina-Lipari-Santa Lucia del Mela
Diocese of Nicosia
Diocese of Patti

 Ecclesiastical Province of Milan
Archdiocese of Milan
Diocese of Bergamo
Diocese of Brescia
Diocese of Como
Diocese of Crema
Diocese of Cremona
Diocese of Lodi
Diocese of Mantua
Diocese of Pavia
Diocese of Vigevano

 Ecclesiastical Province of Modena-Nonantola
Archdiocese of Modena-Nonantola
Diocese of Carpi
Diocese of Fidenza
Diocese of Parma
Diocese of Piacenza-Bobbio
Diocese of Reggio Emilia-Guastalla

 Ecclesiastical Province of Naples
Archdiocese of Naples
Archdiocese of Capua
Archdiocese of Sorrento-Castellammare di Stabia
Diocese of Acerra
Diocese of Alife-Caiazzo
Diocese of Aversa
Diocese of Caserta
Diocese of Ischia
Diocese of Nola
Diocese of Pozzuoli
Diocese of Sessa Aurunca
Diocese of Teano-Calvi
Territorial Prelature of Pompei o Beatissima Vergine Maria del SS.mo Rosario

 Ecclesiastical Province of Oristano
Archdiocese of Oristano
Diocese of Ales-Terralba

 Ecclesiastical Province of Palermo
Archdiocese of Palermo
Archdiocese of Monreale
Diocese of Cefalu 
Diocese of Mazara del Vallo 
Diocese of Trapani

 Ecclesiastical Province of Perugia-Città della Pieve
Archdiocese of Perugia-Città della Pieve
Diocese of Assisi-Nocera Umbra-Gualdo Tadino
Diocese of Città di Castello
Diocese of Foligno
Diocese of Gubbio

 Ecclesiastical Province of Pesaro
Archdiocese of Pesaro
Archdiocese of Urbino-Urbania-Sant'Angelo in Vado
Diocese of Fano-Fossombrone-Cagli-Pergola

 Ecclesiastical Province of Pescara-Penne
Archdiocese of Pescara-Penne
Diocese of Teramo-Atri

 Ecclesiastical Province of Pisa
Archdiocese of Pisa
Diocese of Livorno
Diocese of Massa Carrara-Pontremoli
Diocese of Pescia
Diocese of Volterra

 Ecclesiastical Province of Potenza-Muro Lucano-Marsico Nuovo
Archdiocese of Potenza-Muro Lucano-Marsico Nuovo
Archdiocese of Acerenza
Archdiocese of Matera-Irsina
Diocese of Melfi-Rapolla-Venosa
Diocese of Tricarico
Diocese of Tursi-Lagonegro

 Ecclesiastical Province of Ravenna-Cervia
Archdiocese of Ravenna-Cervia
Diocese of Cesena-Sarsina
Diocese of Forli-Bertinoro
Diocese of Rimini
Diocese of San Marino-Montefeltro

 Ecclesiastical Province of Reggio Calabria-Bova
Archdiocese of Reggio Calabria-Bova
Diocese of Locri-Gerace 
Diocese of Mileto-Nicotera-Tropea
Diocese of Oppido Mamertina-Palmi

 Ecclesiastical Province of Rome
Diocese of Rome
Suburbicarian See of Albano
Suburbicarian See of Frascati
Suburbicarian See of Palestrina
Suburbicarian See of Porto-Santa Rufina
Suburbicarian See of Sabina-Poggio Mirteto
Suburbicarian See of Velletri-Segni
Archdiocese of Gaeta
Diocese of Anagni-Alatri
Diocese of Civita Castellana
Diocese of Civitavecchia-Tarquinia
Diocese of Frosinone-Veroli-Ferentino
Diocese of Latina-Terracina-Sezze-Priverno
Diocese of Rieti
Diocese of Sora-Aquino-Pontecorvo
Diocese of Tivoli
Diocese of Viterbo
Territorial Abbey of Montecassino
Territorial Abbey of San Paolo fuori le Mura
Territorial Abbey of Subiaco

 Ecclesiastical Province of Sassari
Archdiocese of Sassari
Diocese of Alghero-Bosa
Diocese of Ozieri
Diocese of Tempio-Ampurias

 Ecclesiastical Province of Salerno-Campagna-Acerno
Archdiocese of Salerno-Campagna-Acerno
Archdiocese of Amalfi-Cava de' Tirreni
Diocese of Nocera Inferiore-Sarno
Diocese of Teggiano-Policastro
Diocese of Vallo della Lucania
Territorial Abbey of Santissima Trinità di Cava de' Tirreni

 Ecclesiastical Province of Siena-Colle di Val d'Elsa-Montalcino
Archdiocese of Siena-Colle di Val d'Elsa-Montalcino
Diocese of Grosseto
Diocese of Massa Marittima-Piombino
Diocese of Montepulciano-Chiusi-Pienza
Diocese of Pitigliano-Sovana-Orbetello

 Ecclesiastical Province of Siracusa
Archdiocese of Siracusa
Diocese of Noto
Diocese of Ragusa

 Ecclesiastical Province of Taranto
Archdiocese of Taranto
Diocese of Castellaneta
Diocese of Oria

 Ecclesiastical Province of Turin
Archdiocese of Turin
Diocese of Acqui
Diocese of Alba Pompeia
Diocese of Aosta
Diocese of Asti
Diocese of Cuneo
Diocese of Fossano
Diocese of Ivrea
Diocese of Mondovi
Diocese of Pinerolo
Diocese of Saluzzo
Diocese of Susa

 Ecclesiastical Province of Trento
Archdiocese of Trento
Diocese of Bolzano-Brixen

 Ecclesiastical Province of Udine
Archdiocese of Udine

 Ecclesiastical Province of Venice
Archdiocese of Venice
Diocese of Adria-Rovigo
Diocese of Belluno-Feltre
Diocese of Chioggia
Diocese of Concordia-Pordenone
Diocese of Padua
Diocese of Treviso
Diocese of Verona
Diocese of Vicenza
Diocese of Vittorio Veneto

 Ecclesiastical Province of Vercelli
Archdiocese of Vercelli
Diocese of Alessandria della Paglia
Diocese of Biella
Diocese of Casale Monferrato
Diocese of Novara

Episcopal Conference of Malta
 Ecclesiastical Province of Malta
Archdiocese of Malta
Diocese of Gozo

Episcopal Conference of the Netherlands
 Ecclesiastical Province of Utrecht
Archdiocese of Utrecht 
Diocese of Breda
Diocese of Groningen-Leeuwarden
Diocese of Haarlem-Amsterdam
Diocese of Roermond
Diocese of Rotterdam
Diocese of 's-Hertogenbosch

Episcopal Conference of Poland 
 Ecclesiastical province of Białystok 
 Archdiocese of Białystok
 Diocese of Drohiczyn.
 Diocese of Łomża.

 Ecclesiastical province of Częstochowa 
 Archdiocese of Częstochowa.
 Diocese of Radom.
 Diocese of Sosnowiec.

 Ecclesiastical province of Gdańsk 
 Archdiocese of Gdańsk.
 Diocese of Pelplin.
 Diocese of Toruń.

 Ecclesiastical province of Gniezno 
 Archdiocese of Gniezno.
 Diocese of Bydgoszcz.
 Diocese of Włocławek.

 Ecclesiastical province of Katowice 
 Archdiocese of Katowice.
 Diocese of Gliwice.
 Diocese of Opole.

 Ecclesiastical province of Kraków 
 Archdiocese of Kraków.
 Diocese of Bielsko-Żywiec.
 Diocese of Kielce.
 Diocese of Tarnów.

 Ecclesiastical province of Łódź 
 Archdiocese of Łódź.
 Diocese of Łowicz.

 Ecclesiastical province of Lublin 
 Archdiocese of Lublin.
 Diocese of Sandomierz.
 Diocese of Siedlce.

 Ecclesiastical province of Poznań 
 Archdiocese of Poznań.
 Diocese of Kalisz.

 Ecclesiastical province of Przemyśl 
 Archdiocese of Przemyśl
 Diocese of Rzeszów.
 Diocese of Zamość-Lubaczów.

 Ecclesiastical province of Szczecin-Kamień 
 Archdiocese of Szczecin-Kamień.
 Diocese of Koszalin-Kołobrzeg.
 Diocese of Zielona Góra-Gorzów.

 Ecclesiastical province of Warmia 
 Archdiocese of Warmia.
 Diocese of Elbląg.
 Diocese of Ełk.

 Ecclesiastical province of Warszawa 
 Archdiocese of Warszawa.
 Diocese of Płock.
 Diocese of Warszawa-Praga.

 Ecclesiastical province of Wrocław 
 Archdiocese of Wrocław
 Diocese of Legnica 
 Diocese of Świdnica

Episcopal Conference of Portugal
 Ecclesiastical Province of Lisboa
Archdiocese of Lisboa 
Diocese of Angra 
Diocese of Funchal
Diocese of Guarda
Diocese of Leiria-Fátima
Diocese of Portalegre-Castelo Branco
Diocese of Santarém
Diocese of Setúbal

 Ecclesiastical Province of Braga
Archdiocese of Braga 
Diocese of Aveiro 
Diocese of Bragança-Miranda
Diocese of Coimbra
Diocese of Lamego
Diocese of Porto
Diocese of Viana do Castelo
Diocese of Vila Real
Diocese of Viseu

 Ecclesiastical Province of Évora
Archdiocese of Évora 
Diocese of Beja 
Diocese of Faro

Episcopal Conference of Romania
 The Latin rite Ecclesiastical Province of Bucharest
Archdiocese of Bucharest 
Diocese of Iaşi 
Diocese of Oradea Mare
Diocese of Satu Mare
Diocese of Timișoara

Episcopal Conference of Scandinavia 
Immediately subject to the Holy See
Diocese of Copenhagen
Diocese of Helsinki
Diocese of Reykjavík
Diocese of Oslo
Diocese of Stockholm

Episcopal Conference of Scotland 
 Ecclesiastical province of Glasgow
 Archdiocese of Glasgow
 Diocese of Motherwell
 Diocese of Paisley

 Ecclesiastical province of Saint Andrews and Edinburgh 
 Archdiocese of Saint Andrews and Edinburgh
 Diocese of Aberdeen
 Diocese of Argyll and the Isles
 Diocese of Dunkeld
 Diocese of Galloway

Episcopal Conference of Serbia
 Ecclesiastical Province of Beograd
Archdiocese of Beograd 
Diocese of Subotica 
Diocese of Zrenjanin

Episcopal Conference of Slovakia
 Ecclesiastical Province of Bratislava
 Archdiocese of Bratislava
 Archdiocese of Trnava
 Diocese of Banská Bystrica
 Diocese of Nitra
 Diocese of Žilina

 Ecclesiastical Province of Košice
 Archdiocese of Košice
 Diocese of Rožňava
 Diocese of Spišské Podhradie

Episcopal Conference of Slovenia
 Ecclesiastical Province of Ljubljana
Archdiocese of Ljubljana 
Diocese of Koper 
Diocese of Novo Mesto

 Ecclesiastical Province of Maribor
Archdiocese of Maribor 
Diocese of Celje 
Diocese of Murska Sobota

Episcopal Conference of Spain
 Ecclesiastical province of Barcelona 
 Archdiocese of Barcelona
 Diocese of Sant Feliu de Llobregat.
 Diocese of Terrassa.

 Ecclesiastical province of Burgos 
 Archdiocese of Burgos.
 Diocese of Bilbao.
 Diocese of Osma-Soria.
 Diocese of Palencia.
 Diocese of Vitoria.

 Ecclesiastical province of Granada 
 Archdiocese of Granada
 Diocese of Almería
 Diocese of Cartagena
 Diocese of Guadix
 Diocese of Jaén
 Diocese of Málaga

 Ecclesiastical province of Madrid 
 Archdiocese of Madrid.
 Diocese of Alcalá de Henares.
 Diocese of Getafe.

 Ecclesiastical province of Mérida-Badajoz 
 Archdiocese of Mérida-Badajoz.
 Diocese of Coria-Cáceres.
 Diocese of Plasencia.

 Ecclesiastical province of Oviedo 
 Archdiocese of Oviedo.
 Diocese of Astorga.
 Diocese of León.
 Diocese of Santander.

 Ecclesiastical province of Pamplona 
 Archdiocese of Pamplona y Tudela.
 Diocese of Calahorra and La Calzada-Logroño.
 Diocese of Jaca
 Diocese of San Sebastián

 Ecclesiastical province of Santiago de Compostela 
 Archdiocese of Santiago de Compostela.
 Diocese of Lugo.
 Diocese of Mondoñedo-Ferrol.
 Diocese of Ourense.
 Diocese of Tui-Vigo.

 Ecclesiastical province of Seville 
 Archdiocese of Seville.
 Diocese of Cádiz and Ceuta.
 Diocese of the Canaries.
 Diocese of Córdoba.
 Diocese of Huelva.
 Diocese of Jerez de la Frontera.
 Diocese of San Cristóbal de La Laguna.

 Ecclesiastical province of Tarragona 
 Archdiocese of Tarragona
 Diocese of Girona.
 Diocese of Lleida.
 Diocese of Solsona.
 Diocese of Tortosa.
 Diocese of Urgell.
 Diocese of Vic.

 Ecclesiastical province of Toledo 
 Archdiocese of Toledo.
 Diocese of Albacete.
 Diocese of Ciudad Real.
 Diocese of Cuenca.
 Diocese of Sigüenza-Guadalajara.

 Ecclesiastical province of Valencia 
 Archdiocese of Valencia.
 Diocese of Ibiza.
 Diocese of Mallorca.
 Diocese of Menorca.
 Diocese of Orihuela-Alicante.
 Diocese of Segorbe-Castellón.

 Ecclesiastical province of Valladolid 
 Archdiocese of Valladolid
 Diocese of Ávila
 Diocese of Ciudad Rodrigo
 Diocese of Salamanca
 Diocese of Segovia
 Diocese of Zamora.

 Ecclesiastical province of Zaragoza 
 Archdiocese of Zaragoza
 Diocese of Barbastro-Monzón 
 Diocese of Huesca 
 Diocese of Tarazona 
 Diocese of Teruel and Albarracín

Swiss Bishop's Conference
 Immediately subject to the Holy See
Diocese of Basel
Diocese of Chur
Diocese of Lausanne, Geneva and Fribourg
Diocese of Lugano
Diocese of Sankt Gallen
Diocese of Sion

Episcopal Conference of the Ukraine 
 Ecclesiastical province of Lviv

Archdiocese of Lviv
Diocese of Kyiv-Zhytomyr
Diocese of Kamyanets-Podilskyi
Diocese of Lutsk
Diocese of Mukacheve
Diocese of Kharkiv-Zaporizhia
Diocese of Odessa-Simferopol

Immediately Subject to the Holy See

Under the direct authority of the Holy See
Croatia
Archdiocese of Zadar
Estonia
Apostolic Administration of Estonia
Gibraltar
Diocese of Gibraltar
Greece
Archdiocese of Athenai 
Archdiocese of Rhodos
Apostolic Vicariate of Thessaloniki
Italy
Archdiocese of Lucca 
Archdiocese of Spoleto
Diocese of Terni-Narni-Amelia
Diocese of Orvieto-Todi
Kosovo
Diocese of Prizren-Pristina
Liechtenstein
Archdiocese of Vaduz
Luxembourg
Archdiocese of Luxembourg
Monaco
Archdiocese of Monaco
Montenegro
Archdiocese of Bar 
Romania
Archdiocese of Alba Iulia

See also
Catholic Church by country
Catholic Church in Africa
Catholic Church in Asia
Catholic Church in North America
Catholic Church in Latin America
Catholic Church in Oceania
List of Dioceses in Europe:
List of Catholic dioceses in Nordic Europe
List of Catholic dioceses in the Balkans
Roman Catholicism in Australia

Notes

References

Europe